Miro Fiore "Meeno" Peluce (born February 26, 1970) is a Dutch-born American photographer and actor.

Life and career
Peluce was born in Amsterdam, Netherlands, the son of Sondra Londy, a Jewish-American personal manager and caterer, and Floyd Peluce, a certified public accountant. He has one half-sister, actress Soleil Moon Frye, whose father was actor Virgil Frye.

Peluce made guest appearances on television shows during the 1970s and early 1980s, including Starsky & Hutch, Kojak, Benson, The Love Boat, Diff'rent Strokes, The Incredible Hulk, Happy Days, The A-Team, Silver Spoons, Manimal, Remington Steele, Scarecrow and Mrs. King, and on Punky Brewster with his half-sister (who played the titular character). Among his regular television roles were Tanner Boyle in The Bad News Bears, Daniel Best in Best of the West, and as history prodigy Jeffrey Jones in Voyagers!. He appeared in the pilot episode of the M*A*S*H spin-off W*A*L*T*E*R with Gary Burghoff, but the series was never picked up.

He has worked as a writer and director.  He appeared in several television films, including The Ghost of Flight 401, Night Cries, Fast Friends, and World War III. He starred in the original 1979 theatrical release of The Amityville Horror as one of the Lutz children, and also appeared in the 1981 horror film Don't Go Near the Park. Peluce also appeared in the music video for "The Last in Line" by the group Dio.

Peluce attended UC Santa Cruz and worked as a history teacher at Hollywood High School in the 1990s. He returned to film during 1998, co-writing and co-producing Wild Horses (also titled Lunch Time Special) with sister Soleil Moon Frye, and in 2001 when he appeared in Alex in Wonder (also titled Sex and a Girl).

Peluce is a photographer with celebrity studio sessions to his credit.

Filmography

References

Bibliography
 Holmstrom, John. The Moving Picture Boy: An International Encyclopaedia from 1895 to 1995. Norwich, Michael Russell, 1996, p. 373.

External links
 

1970 births
20th-century American male actors
21st-century American male actors
American male child actors
American male film actors
Jewish American male actors
American people of Italian descent
Schoolteachers from California
Living people
Male actors from Amsterdam
Dutch emigrants to the United States
American photographers
21st-century American Jews